CFOU-FM (89.1 MHz) is a French language radio station that broadcasts in Trois-Rivières, Quebec, Canada.  It is the campus radio station of the Université du Québec à Trois-Rivières.

History

CFOU-FM was licensed by the Canadian Radio-television and Telecommunications Commission in 1997, and originally operated with a transmitter power of 250 watts.

In 2006, the station received CRTC approval to increase its effective radiated power to 3,000 watts.

References

External links
CFOU-FM
 

Fou
Fou
Fou
Radio stations established in 1997
1997 establishments in Quebec